Pseudopostega pexa is a moth of the family Opostegidae. It is only known from north-eastern Brazil.

The length of the forewings is about 3.2 mm. Adults are mostly white. Adults have been collected in July.

External links
A Revision of the New World Plant-Mining Moths of the Family Opostegidae (Lepidoptera: Nepticuloidea)

Opostegidae
Moths described in 1920